Kurt Schumacher (1895–1952) was a German politician.

Kurt Schumacher may also refer to:

Kurt Schumacher (American football) (born 1952), American football player
Kurt Schumacher (sculptor) (1905–1942), German sculptor
Kurt Schumacher (SS officer) (1923–1945), German SS officer
Marcel Cordes (born Kurt Schumacher, 1920–1992), German baritone

See also
Kurt-Schumacher-Platz (Berlin U-Bahn), station on Berlin U-Bahn, named after the German politician